The year 557 BC was a year of the pre-Julian Roman calendar. In the Roman Empire, it was known as year 197 Ab urbe condita. The denomination 557 BC for this year has been used since the early medieval period, when the Anno Domini calendar era became the prevalent method in Europe for naming years.

Events
 May 19: The Persians besiege Larissa (Calah) but fail to capture it. However, when a solar eclipse occurs, the inhabitants leave their city and it is taken.
 The Jain spiritual teacher Mahavira (b. 599 BC) attains omniscience in this year.
 Labashi-Marduk is king of Babylon during this year, succeeding Neriglissar, who reigned three years, and is followed by Nabonidus, who reigns 17 years.
 Santorini, Greece suffers from a volcanic eruption.

Births
 Siddharta Gautama, also known as the Buddha (year of birth not precisely known)

Deaths

References

550s BC